Mambury Njie (born 27 June 1962) is a Gambian politician and the current Minister of Finance and Economic Affairs in Adama Barrow's cabinet.

Education 
In 1986, Njie graduated with a Bachelor of Arts in economics and political science from East Stroudsburg University of Pennsylvania in the United States. In 1993, he completed a master of arts in international affairs at Columbia University, New York.

Political career

Early career 
Njie entered government service as an analyst with the Policy Analysis Unit, Office of the President, from 1989 to 1990. For the next two years, he worked as an economist with the Department of State for Finance and Economic Affairs. From February 1994 to July 1996, he worked as principal economist and head of the Macroeconomic and Financial Analysis Unit (MFAU) at the department.

He entered the foreign service in July 1996 as economic counsellor at the Gambian Embassy in Taipei, Taiwan. From January, he became acting deputy head of mission, an in March he became chargé d'affaires at the embassy. From November 1997 to June 2001, Njie was the acting Gambian Ambassador to Taiwan and the Philippines.

Presidential advisor and Minister 
In July 2001, Njie returned to The Gambia and worked as Permanent Secretary at the Office of the President. He oversaw the President's Empowerment for Girls' Education Project and also the creation of the Gambia National Petroleum Company (GNPC). From November 2004 to June 2005, he worked as the managing director of the Social Security and Housing Finance Corporation (SSHFC).

In June 2005, Njie was appointed as Secretary General and Head of the Civil Service of The Gambia, and acted as the President's principal advisor. He left this role in October 2006 but in December 2007 he was appointed as Gambian Ambassador to the United Arab Emirates. He remained in the UAE until December 2009. In May 2010, Njie was appointed Ambassador-at-Large and Special Advisor to the President on Economic Affairs and Energy, and in July he became Minister of Economic Planning and Industrial Development.

In February 2011, Njie was appointed to a senior cabinet position as Minister of Finance and Economic Affairs. He was reshuffled to become Minister of Foreign Affairs in April 2012, but was dismissed from government in August 2012. He was reportedly removed for opposing the execution of nine inmates on death row.

Arrest and subsequent career 
In 2014, Njie was arrested on two charges of economic crime and neglect of duties. He was acquitted by Justice Mikailu Abdulahi in Banjul High Court on 3 July 2014. He was arrested again in his home in Brusubi by National Intelligence Agency (NIA) operatives on 9 October 2014, and taken to their headquarters in Banjul. He was detained for two weeks before being transferred to Serekunda General Hospital on 28 November 2014. He was released from detention in July 2015.

In August 2017, Adama Barrow appointed Njie as managing director of the GNPC, which he had helped found.

Minister of Finance and Economic Affairs 
In a July 2018 cabinet reshuffle, Barrow appointed Njie as Minister of Finance and Economic Affairs, the only former Jammeh minister appointed at the time.

Other activities
 ECOWAS Bank for Investment and Development (EBID), Ex-Officio Member of the Board of Governors (since 2018)

Recognition
Njie was awarded the Grand Cordon of the Order of Brilliant Star in 2001. In 2005, he became an Officer of the Order of the Republic of The Gambia.

References

Living people
1962 births
Finance ministers of the Gambia
Government ministers of the Gambia
Ambassadors of the Gambia to Taiwan